Geoffrey Bartlett is an Australian sculptor working in Melbourne. Bartlett's career in sculpture has spanned over almost 50 years since 1973. He is known for both his studio-based works and major public commissions in sculpture. 
Bartlett's work has been noted for its contribution to modern Australia sculpture.
In 2007, the National Gallery of Victoria held a major retrospective on Bartlett's work since 1987.

Biography

Early life and education
Bartlett was born in Melbourne in 1952 and grew up in country Victoria. He grew up in Warrnambool and spent his teenage years in Shepparton.

His father was the manager of Maples, the old furniture shop. Bartlett would enjoy tinkering and building with timber from crates that his father would bring home from his job.

While in Shepparton High School, Bartlett was introduced to bronze casting by Phillip Cannizzio, a local sculptor. Cannizzio and Bartlett would cast bronze pieces at the J.Furphy and Sons engineering works. Cannizzio's example gave young Bartlett the sense that a career as a sculptor was possible.

Career

Early career 1973–1982
After graduation in 1973, Bartlett set up a studio with Anthony Pryor and Augustine Dall'Ava at 108 Gertrude Street in the inner Melbourne suburb of Fitzroy.
The three sculptors would share studios for the next 19 years.

In 1976, Bartlett had his first solo exhibition at the Ewing and George Paton Galleries at the University of Melbourne. The exhibition had been selected by Patrick McCaughey and curated under the directorship of Kiffy Rubbo, both of whom have launched the careers of young Australian artists.

New York 1983–1985
The Harkness Fellowship allowed Bartlett to undertake a Master of Fine Arts (Hons) at Columbia University in New York. During this period in New York, Bartlett would construct more three-dimensional works, developing from his early works that were made to be viewed from a frontal perspective.

While in New York, Bartlett visited the major art galleries in New York and met sculptors such as Isamu Noguchi, Frank Stella and Clement Meadmore.

Bartlett cites David Smith, a well-known abstract expressionist, as an source of inspiration when starting out as a young sculptor. While in New York, he viewed Smith's work for the first time.

Victor and Loti Smorgan, who were philanthropists and patron of the arts, paid for the shipping of Bartlett's 17 sculptures back to Australia. The works from New York were subsequently exhibited at the Pinacotheca in 1986.

Present
Upon Returning to Melbourne, Bartlett established a studio in a former clothing factory in Collingwood to work independently as a sculptor.
Bartlett would also resign from his full time teaching positions. Doing so allowed him to focus on his sculptural practice, in the same manner and intensity that he had been afforded in New York.

Work

Major public commissions
Bartlett was awarded the Ian Potter Foundation Sculpture Commission in 1982. This would be his first major public commission. The sculpture entitled 'The Messenger' was installed in the front moat of the National Gallery of Victoria for twenty years, fronting St Kilda Road. The sculpture is currently installed in the Grimwade Gardens in the National Gallery of Victoria.

Canberra's Parliament House Program acquired two of Bartlett's painted steel sculptures that were made in New York, Two Points of View (1985) and Lessons in Gravity (1994). The two works face the Chambers of the House of Representatives and the Senate.

Melbourne City Council have commissioned two of Bartlett's sculptures. One of these commissions is Constellation (1996) that was a collaborative sculpture between Bruce Armstrong and Bartlett.

Responses
Bartlett's sculptures are described as volumetric and sensual. Bartlett's sculptures are characterised by attention to detail, surface finishes and means of assembly and disassembly of the work.
His sculptures are able to suggest space, scale, movement, containment and time.

Gallery

Selected exhibitions
The following selection highlights the exhibitions that were held at key points during Bartlett's career as a sculptor.

Solo exhibitions (selection)
 2019 ‘Geoffrey Bartlett’, Australian Galleries, Sydney
 2017 ‘1988 – 2017 Revised’, Australian Galleries, Melbourne
 2015 ‘Geoffrey Bartlett: 280205’, McClelland Sculpture Park and Gallery, Langwarrin, Victoria
 2007 ‘Geoffrey Bartlett’, National Gallery of Victoria, Melbourne
 2004 ‘Geoffrey Bartlett’, Drill Hall Gallery, Australian National University, Canberra
 'Endangered Species’, Boutwell Draper Gallery, Sydney
 2002 ‘Geoffrey Bartlett: The Shell’, fortyfivedownstairs, Melbourne
 2001 ‘Geoffrey Bartlett: Silver Cloud’, Stonington Stables Museum of Art, Deakin University, Melbourne; touring to University of Technology Gallery, Sydney
 2000 ‘Recent Sculpture’, Beaver Galleries, Canberra
 1994 ‘Geoffrey Bartlett: Sculpture 1977-1994’, Waverley City Gallery, and touring to McClelland Sculpture Park and Gallery, Hamilton Art Gallery, Mildura Arts Centre, Latrobe Regional Art Gallery and Australian Galleries, Sydney in 1994-95
 1993 ‘Woman: Sculpture and etchings’, Macquarie Galleries, Sydney and Australian Galleries, Melbourne
 1987 ‘Painted bronze’, Pinacotheca, Melbourne
 1985 ‘Geoffrey Bartlett’, Macquarie Galleries, Sydney
 1981 ‘Sculpture’, Pinacotheca, Melbourne
 1976, 'Geoffrey Bartlett', Ewing and George Paton Gallery, University of Melbourne, Melbourne, Australia

Joint exhibitions with Augustine Dall'Ava and Anthony Pryor
 1987 ‘Recent Sculpture’, Anima Gallery, Adelaide
 1979 ‘The Second and Last 108’, Gertrude Street Sculpture Show, Fitzroy, Melbourne
 1978 ‘Made in Fitzroy: Exhibition 3: Three Australian Sculptors’, Queen Victoria
 Museum & Art Gallery, Launceston, School of Art, Hobart and Burnie Art Gallery
 ‘Recent Sculpture’, Watters Gallery, Sydney
 ‘Three Melbourne Sculptors’, Solander Gallery, Canberra
 1977 ‘Sculpture Exhibition’, RMIT Gallery, Melbourne
 1976 ‘108 Gertrude Street Studio Show’, Fitzroy, Melbourne Realities Gallery, Melbourne

Group exhibitions (selection)
 2020 ‘The 9th Palmer Sculpture Biennial’, Palmer, SA
 ‘Melbourne Modern: European art & design at RMIT since 1945’, RMIT Gallery, Melbourne
 2016 Sculpture by the Sea – Twentieth Annual Exhibition (Winner, Helen Lempriere Scholarship), Bondi, Sydney
 ‘Contemporary Small Sculpture Award’, Deakin University Art Gallery, Melbourne
 ‘Backward Glance: Important works from the 1980s’, John Buckley Gallery, Melbourne
 2005 ‘National Sculpture Prize and Exhibition’, National Gallery of Australia, Canberra, and touring to Macquarie Bank offices in Sydney, Melbourne and Dell Gallery at Queensland College of the Arts, Brisbane
 2004 ‘Shanghai Art Fair’, Shanghai
 2003 ‘National Sculpture Prize and Exhibition’, National Gallery of Australia, Canberra
 1996 ‘Sculpture Walk’, Royal Botanic Gardens, Melbourne
 1988 ‘World Expo 88 Collection, Sculpture’ Southbank, Brisbane‘Collaborative Designs: Working Together with Architecture’, Meat Market Craft Centre, Melbourne
 ‘Pinacotheca Group Show’, Pinacotheca, Melbourne
 1981 ‘First Australian Sculpture Triennial’, La Trobe University, Melbourne

See also
 Patrick McCaughey
 Victor Smorgon
 Isamu Noguchi
 Clement Meadmore
 Bruce Armstrong
 Kiffy Rubbo

References

1952 births
Living people
20th-century Australian sculptors
21st-century Australian sculptors
Artists from Melbourne